The enzyme 2,2-dialkylglycine decarboxylase (pyruvate) catalyzes the chemical reaction

2,2-dialkylglycine + pyruvate  dialkyl ketone + CO2 + L-alanine

This enzyme belongs to the family of lyases, specifically the carboxy-lyases, which cleave carbon-carbon bonds.  The systematic name of this enzyme class is 2,2-dialkylglycine carboxy-lyase (amino-transferring L-alanine-forming). Other names in common use include dialkyl amino acid (pyruvate) decarboxylase, alpha-dialkyl amino acid transaminase, 2,2-dialkyl-2-amino acid-pyruvate aminotransferase, L-alanine-alpha-ketobutyrate aminotransferase, dialkylamino-acid decarboxylase (pyruvate), and 2,2-dialkylglycine carboxy-lyase (amino-transferring). It employs one cofactor, pyridoxal phosphate.

Structural studies

References

 

EC 4.1.1
Pyridoxal phosphate enzymes
Enzymes of known structure